Dysaethria scopocera is a moth of the family Uraniidae first described by George Hampson in 1896. It is found in Sri Lanka, Taiwan, Malaysia and Borneo.

The wingspan of the female is 9 mm. Wings are variegated black where broadly dull and medially red. Forewings with an irregular, angled, darker submarginal line. Postmedial strong and irregularly arched with concave base. Tails of hindwings rudimentary, though an angular pattern can be seen.

Two subspecies are recognized.
Dysaethria scopocera formosibia (Strand, 1917) - Taiwan
Dysaethria scopocera longiductus Holloway, 1998 - Borneo

References

Moths of Asia
Moths described in 1896
Uraniidae